Navarra Arena is an indoor sporting arena and fronton located in Pamplona, Spain. Its capacity is 9,808 people in the main court and 3,000 in the fronton.

History

Located in the place of the old swimming pools property of local football club CA Osasuna, Reyno de Navarra Arena started to be built in 2009. In May 2013, despite being the works being very close to completion, Reyno de Navarra Arena continues to be closed.

In May 2016, the two main enterprises of Basque pelota ruled out an opening in 2016.

The Navarra Arena was finally inaugurated on 29 September 2018 with a final of a Basque pelota championship. The first match played at the main court was a basketball friendly match between Spain and Lithuania, hosted on 2 August 2019. The arena registered a sold-out.

See also
 List of indoor arenas in Spain

References

External links

Official website
Reyno de Navarra Arena at Waagner Biro

Indoor arenas in Spain
Basketball venues in Spain
Fronton (court)
Sports venues in Navarre
Sports venues completed in 2018
Sport in Pamplona
2018 establishments in Spain